Big Is Beautiful is a 2012 French comedy film, directed by Charlotte de Turckheim and starring Lola Dewaere, Victoria Abril and Catherine Hosmalin.

Plot
The young, round and lovely Nina is married to Gaspard, who, unfortunately, rather likes very thin women. The couple move to Paris and Nina is preparing to launch a sophisticated line of swimwear. Because of her love for her husband, Nina accepts his ambiguous gift: a slimming treatment at Brides-les-Bains, considered "the last hope of the fat". There, she makes two flamboyant friends. Sophie, a lawyer from Marseille who likes to control everything, including herself. Émilie is a caregiver whose weight has begun to affect her health and her love life yet her motto remains, "Big is beautiful".

Cast

 Lola Dewaere as Nina
 Victoria Abril as Sophie
 Catherine Hosmalin as Emilie
 Grégory Fitoussi as Gaspard
 Mehdi Nebbou as Doctor Hachemi
 Julia Piaton as Roxanne
 Raphaël Lenglet as Yussuf
 Dominique Besnehard as Antoine
 Martin Daquin as Thomas
 Pauline Lefèvre as Natacha
 Anouk Aimée as Mom
 Charlotte de Turckheim as Christelle
 Pascal Légitimus as Freddy
 Christine Citti as Roxanne's mother
 Frédéric Chau as Baptiste
 Claudine Wilde as Gundrun
 Émilie Gavois-Kahn as Nathalie
 Pascal Liger as Hans
 Valérie Moreau as Isabelle
 Alain Stern as Fred
 Barbara Bolotner as Jessica
 Vincent Bowen as Romain
 Jean-Baptiste Perichon as Léo
 David Salles as Andrej
 Jitka Grekova as Xenia
 Eric Boucher as Jean-Paul
 Alexis Sellam as Monsieur Scrabble
 Pablo Pauly as The driver

References

External links

2012 films
2010s French-language films
2012 comedy films
French comedy films
2010s French films